"Doctor Jones" is a song by Danish dance-pop group Aqua. Released as the band's fourth single overall, it was the follow-up to their most successful song "Barbie Girl" in many regions. "Doctor Jones" ended the assumptions that Aqua would be a one-hit wonder, although they would remain so in America with "Barbie Girl" until "Lollipop (Candyman)" reached the top 40 on the Billboard Hot 100.

"Doctor Jones" was released around the world in a number of months, with the first release being in October 1997. December 1997 saw the Australian release achieve a successful chart placing at  1 for seven consecutive weeks before the song was issued in the United Kingdom in January of the following year. There, it became the group's second No. 1 single, topping the chart for three weeks. Throughout the rest of Europe, the song reached the top 10 in 11 countries, topping the charts of Croatia, Ireland, and Italy.

Critical reception
Can't Stop the Pop noted, "Swimming amidst a sea of killer hooks is the chorus, which at times feels almost a little forgotten. It’s testament to the rest of the song being so good that this winds up being the case, rather than the chorus itself being poor." A reviewer from Daily Record stated that the band "give Indiana Jones the pop treatment last offered to Mattel's Barbie dolls." Pan-European magazine Music & Media wrote, "The motto 'if it ain't broke, don't fix it' seems to have been the creed of the Aqua team when they came up with this worthy successor to the phenomenon that is Barbie Girl. Not only is it a strong pop song in its own right, but the inclusion of some tasty remixes by Antiloop and Molella & Phil Jay among others could arouse interest from programmers who usually chart their course away from the mainstream." Bob Waliszewski of Plugged In noted that the "bouncy" tune deal with "the end to a summer of love". Pop Rescue commented, "Again, the contrast and back-and-forth between René's gruff vocals and Lene's higher pitched dance 'eye-pee-eye-ay' vocals really help this track to keep it's up-tempo pace and catchiness. The track is fun, aided by the duo's vocal play and caricatures." Nick Reed from The Quietus noted the song as a stand out from the album, adding that "it's so effortlessly catchy, with all these little bouncy melody lines, an awesome call-and-response bit, and a chorus with an out-of-nowhere "Wake up now!" line that still makes me laugh today. For this one moment, Aqua were able to channel ABBA at their best, and managed to write a truly perfect pop song in the process."

Chart performance
"Doctor Jones" proved to be very successful on the charts on several continents. In Europe, it peaked at number-one in Ireland, Italy, Scotland and the United Kingdom. In the latter, it hit the top spot in its first week at the UK Singles Chart, on February 1, 1998. The single spent two weeks at the top. It managed to climb into the Top 10 also in Austria, Belgium, Denmark, Finland, Germany, the Netherlands, Spain and Sweden (number 2), as well as on the Eurochart Hot 100, where it reached number 3. Outside Europe, "Doctor Jones" was a number-one hit in Australia for seven weeks, while it peaked at number 2 in New Zealand, being held off reaching the top spot by Backstreet Boys' "As Long As You Love Me". In the United States, it charted on the Billboard Hot Dance Club Play, peaking at number 18. It was awarded with a gold record in Germany and the Netherlands, and a platinum record in Belgium, New Zealand, Sweden and the UK. In Australia, the single earned a 3× platinum record.

Music video
The music video implies the song is based around the Indiana Jones character from the film series of the same name, with René Dif playing Jones and rescuing his fellow band members from a stereotypical voodoo tribe. The title logo is written in a similar form to that of the Indiana Jones logo. There is also a shot of airplane's flight path over a map, which is used in the film series. The lyric "Dr. Jones, wake up now" may also be a reference to Indiana Jones and the Temple of Doom where Short Round implores Indiana Jones to "wake up" after being brainwashed by the blood of Kālī Ma, or during a scene on an airplane when Willie Scott says, "Calling Dr. Jones, wake up!".

The video was one of five Aqua videos directed by Peder Pedersen, who would later spoof the Indiana Jones-movies again in his computer-animated short film Lego Indiana Jones and the Raiders of the Lost Brick (2008).

Track listings

European CD1 and UK cassette single
 "Doctor Jones" (radio edit) – 3:22
 "Doctor Jones" (extended version) – 5:13

European CD2
 "Doctor Jones" (radio edit)
 "Doctor Jones" (extended mix)
 "Doctor Jones" (Adrenalin club mix)
 "Doctor Jones" (Molella and Phil Jay mix)
 "Doctor Jones" (MPJ speed dub)
 "Doctor Jones" (Antiloop club mix)
 "Doctor Jones" (D-Bop's Prescription mix)

UK CD1
 "Doctor Jones" (radio edit) – 3:22
 "Doctor Jones" (extended mix) – 5:13
 "Doctor Jones" (Adrenalin club mix) – 6:21
 "Doctor Jones" (Molella and Phil Jay mix) – 5:19
 "Doctor Jones" (Antiloop club mix) – 10:00
 "Doctor Jones" (D-Bop's Prescription mix) – 8:02

UK CD2
 "Doctor Jones" (radio edit) – 3:22
 "Doctor Jones" (Metro's 7-inch edit) – 3:36
 "Doctor Jones" (Metro's X-ray dub) – 6:22
 "Doctor Jones" (Metro's full video)

Australian CD single
 "Doctor Jones" (radio track)
 "Doctor Jones" (extended mix)
 "Barbie Girl" (extended version)
 "My Oh My" (extended version)
 "Roses Are Red" (club version)
 "Barbie Girl" (Dirty Rotten Scoundrel Clinical 12-inch mix)

Charts

Weekly charts

Year-end charts

Certifications

Release history

References

1997 singles
1997 songs
Aqua (band) songs
Indiana Jones music
Irish Singles Chart number-one singles
Number-one singles in Australia
Number-one singles in Italy
Number-one singles in Scotland
UK Singles Chart number-one singles